Estaj, also rendered as Estach, may refer to:
 Estaj, Kerman
 Estaj, Mashhad, Razavi Khorasan Province
 Estaj, Sabzevar, Razavi Khorasan Province
 Estaj, Yazd